A total solar eclipse occurred on July 8, 1842. A solar eclipse occurs when the Moon passes between Earth and the Sun, thereby totally or partly obscuring the image of the Sun for a viewer on Earth. A total solar eclipse occurs when the Moon's apparent diameter is larger than the Sun's, blocking all direct sunlight, turning day into darkness. Totality occurs in a narrow path across Earth's surface, with the partial solar eclipse visible over a surrounding region thousands of kilometres wide.

Observations 

Francis Baily observed the total solar eclipse from Italy, focusing his attention on the solar corona and prominences and identified them as part of the Sun's atmosphere. The solar eclipse effect now called Baily's beads named in honor of him after his correct explanation of the phenomenon in 1836.

Related eclipses 
It is a part of solar Saros 124.

References

 NASA chart graphics
 Googlemap
 NASA Besselian elements
 Solar eclipse of July 8, 1842 in Russia
 Chronology of Discoveries about the Sun
 

1842 7 8
1842 in science
1842 7 8
July 1842 events